Bajgah (also Romanized as Bājgāh; also known as Bachke Sarāy) is a village in Derak Rural District, in the Central District of Shiraz County, Fars Province, Iran. At the 2006 census, its population was 2,188, in 554 families.

References 

Populated places in Shiraz County